James W. Brown (born 1953) is a retired American diplomat, mainly specializing in Mandarin Chinese. More commonly known simply as “Jim” he has translated for 6 U.S presidents since Ronald Reagan to more recently Donald Trump’s visit to China in November of 2017

Brown was born in Washington D.C. as the son of a U.S. diplomat, and studied history and international relations at the Fu Jen University in Taiwan before joining Pan-American Airlines in the late 1970s. In 1980, he was hired by the U.S. Department of Defense, and joined the U.S. State Department the following year. Although admitting that he wanted to be a "generalist", the U.S. government considered his proficiency in the Chinese language to be an asset as China reopened its once-closed gate to the world at that time, and assigned Brown to multiple tenures at the U.S. Embassy in Beijing. He retired from the State Department in 2021. In 2021 Jim became a fellow at the University of San Diego’s China Center.  

Brown's languages include Cantonese, French, Japanese, and Korean, but is best known for his knowledge of the Mandarin language. Brown remarked that his proficiency in the Chinese language had caught locals off-guard. Brenda Sprague, then the State Department's Director of Language Services, explained that the ability to perform consecutive and simultaneous translation during formal diplomatic and senior-level functions was the highest level of language expertise, but that "At Jim's level, there is only one Jim".

References 

1953 births
Living people
People from Washington, D.C.
American diplomats
United States Foreign Service personnel
Fu Jen Catholic University alumni